Klas Artur Lindström (27 October 1920 – 2 June 2009) was a Swedish ice hockey player. He competed in the men's tournament at the 1948 Winter Olympics.

References

1920 births
2009 deaths
Ice hockey players at the 1948 Winter Olympics
Olympic ice hockey players of Sweden
Ice hockey people from Stockholm
Swedish ice hockey players